Joseph S. Francisco (born 26 March 1955) is an American scientist and the former president of the American Chemical Society from 2009 to 2010.  He currently serves as the President's Distinguished Professor of Earth and Environmental Science and Professor of Chemistry at the University of Pennsylvania. He served as the Dean of College of Arts and Sciences, Elmer H. and Ruby M.Cordes Chair in chemistry at University of Nebraska in Lincoln until 2018.

Family and education
Joseph Francisco was born in New Orleans, Louisiana, on March 26, 1955. He was born to Lucinda and Joe Francisco, Sr., but grew up in Beaumont, Texas with his grandmother Sarah Walker. As he was growing up in Beaumont, Texas, his possibilities were limited because of who he was and what he looked like. His life consisted of day-to-day tasks and was never about future planning. College was a far-fetched dream, so he never paid much attention to it. Despite the uncertainty, his grandmother, Sarah Walker, who was a strong woman and a great role model for him—was supportive and encouraged him to get an education. He attended Forest Park High School.

Dr. Richard B. Price of Lamar University who he had met by chance encouraged him to pursue a college education. In 1973, he entered the University of Texas, Austin and graduated in 1977. He entered the Massachusetts Institute of Technology (MIT), as a graduate student (PhD, and graduated in 1983). In 1983, at age 27, Francisco decided to travel to pursue and obtain his postdoctoral research fellow in Cambridge University, England. In 1992, Francisco married Priya, and has three daughters. He currently resides in Philadelphia with his family.

Career

Academic chemist 
As a researcher, Francisco has made important contributions in many areas of Atmospheric Chemistry. His research revolutionized our understanding of chemical processes in the atmosphere.
Francisco and his colleague Marsha Lester, the University of Pennsylvania's Edmund J. Kahn Distinguished Professor have discovered an unusual molecule that is essential to the atmosphere's ability to break down pollutants, especially the compounds that cause acid rain. It's the unusual chemistry facilitated by this molecule, however, that will attract the most attention from scientists.
Somewhat like a human body metabolizing food, the Earth's atmosphere has the ability to "burn," or oxidize pollutants, especially nitric oxides emitted from sources such as factories and automobiles. What doesn't get oxidized in the atmosphere falls back to Earth in the form of acid rain.
"The chemical details of how the atmosphere removes nitric acid have not been clear," Francisco says. "This gives us important insights into this process. Without that knowledge we really can't understand the conditions under which nitric acid is removed from the atmosphere.

Francisco says the discovery will allow scientists to better model how pollutants react in the atmosphere and to predict potential outcomes.A technical paper describing the molecule is published in a special edition of the Proceedings of the National Academy of Sciences.

Francisco's laboratory focuses on basic studies in spectroscopy, kinetics, and photochemistry of novel transient species in the gas phase. Joe has published more than 400 journal articles, written nine book chapters and co-authored the textbook, Chemical Kinetics and Dynamics.

Academic and professional appointments 
Francisco currently serves as the President's Distinguished Professor of Earth and Environmental Science and Professor of Chemistry at the University of Pennsylvania. He served as the Dean of College of Arts and Sciences, Elmer H. and Ruby M.Cordes Chair in chemistry at University of Nebraska in Lincoln until 2018. He was president of the National Organization for the Professional Advancement of Black Chemists and Chemical Engineers from 2006 to 2008. He was appointed a senior visiting fellow at the Institute of Advanced Studies at the University of Bologna, Italy; Professeur Invité at the Université de Paris-Est, France; a visiting professor at Uppsala Universitet,Sweden; and an Honorary International Chair Professor, National Taipei University of Technology, Taiwan. He served as president of the American Chemical Society in 2010. He was elected as the Fellow of the American Academy of Arts and Sciences, 2010 and was elected member of the U.S. National Academy of Sciences in 2013. He also received the honorary Doctor of Science degree, Tuskegee University., 2010. President Barack Obama appointed Joseph S. Francisco, PhD, to serve on the President's Committee on the National Medal of Science for the period 2010–2012, 2012–2014.
In 2021 he was elected to the American Philosophical Society.

Awards 

 Fellow of the American Physical Society (1998)
 Fellow of the American Association for the Advancement of Science (2001)
 Fellow of the American Chemical Society (2012)
 Guggenheim Fellow (1993).
 Alexander von Humboldt U.S.Senior Scientist Award

References

External links 
Research group home page

https://web.archive.org/web/20130527095103/http://www.nasonline.org/news-and-multimedia/news/2013_04_30_NAS_Election.html
https://web.archive.org/web/20100310103958/http://www.chem.purdue.edu/people/faculty/faculty.asp?itemID=32

1955 births
Living people
American physical chemists
21st-century American physicists
Fellows of the American Association for the Advancement of Science
Massachusetts Institute of Technology alumni
People from Beaumont, Texas
Presidents of the American Chemical Society
Purdue University faculty
University of Texas at Austin College of Natural Sciences alumni
Atmospheric chemists
Members of the American Philosophical Society
University of Pennsylvania faculty